Castle (also known as Palace) is a card game designed by Bruno Faidutti and Serge Laget, played with 2-5 players. It is a shedding card game, i.e. the winning player is the one who disposes of all of their cards (in hand and personal deck) first.

Game play 
This game was made by Francesca Flores. Each player begins the game with a hand of cards. The number of cards in hand and deck depend upon the number of players in the game. The remaining cards go into a draw pile. The players' castles are built in front of them. The game begins when the person with the lowest card lays a card.

Deal 
Cards are dealt 3 at a time, the first set of three dealt to each player is placed face-down. These cards cannot be seen until the draw pile is gone. Players will then have been dealt 6 cards to pick up. Players choose the best 3 cards to place on top of their face down castle. These 6 cards become their entire castle and the three remaining cards become their hand to play with. Players have three cards in their hand at all times until reaching the castle. Players reach the castle without any cards in hand unless required to pick up the discard pile.

Rhythm 
Players take turns playing their cards in an increasing order. If a player cannot beat the previous card they must pick up the entire pile. Each time a card is played, a card must be drawn from the deck until it is finished before moving onto the castle.

Clearing a castle 
The player chooses to go from left or right on their castle. In all cases the three bottom cards must be played in the same order. The top three cards must be played first. Then the bottom three cards are played in the same order. Only you look at the card next in order on the bottom and you can only look at that card until you get rid of it. When you get rid of the previous card you may look at the card next in line and see if it is playable if not then move onto the next persons turn and wait till you can play it. When the first person’s castle is cleared then they are the winner.

Specials 
Four of a kind clears the pile (clearing pile means all cards under the four of a kind and including the Four of a kind get set aside and are no longer in play)The card number 2 allows you to play again. 

10- if a 10 is played then it clears the pile of cards ( playing a 10 means you clear the pile by setting all the cards under the 10 and including the 10 aside out of play)  

2- if a 2 is played it allows you to play any card you wish to play afterward.

Castle won the 2000 Concours International de Créateurs de Jeux de Société.

References

External links

Castle on Bruno Faidutti's website.

Card games introduced in 2000
Dedicated deck card games
Shedding-type card games
Bruno Faidutti games